Pawhuska (meaning: "White Hair") is a city in and the county seat of Osage County, Oklahoma, United States. It was named after the 19th-century Osage chief, Paw-Hiu-Skah, which means "White Hair" in English.  The Osage tribal government, which opened offices in Pawhuska in 1872 when its reservation was established in Indian Territory, continues to be based in Pawhuska.

One of the United States' first Boy Scout troops was organized here in 1909.

History
The town, originally known as Deep Ford, was established in 1872 with the reservation for the Osage Nation, part of Indian Territory. The Osage Indian Agency was located along Bird Creek. One of the three main bands of the tribe settled here. Traders followed, building stores during 1872 and 1873. Pawhuska's first newspaper, the Indian Herald (also known as Wah-Sha-She News.), was founded in 1875 by George Edward Tinker, an Osage who became the father of Clarence L. Tinker, highest-ranking Native American officer in the US Army. The first post office opened in 1876.

The Midland Valley Railroad reached Pawhuska in September 1905. By the time of statehood in 1907, the town population was 2,407.

The first Boy Scout troop is claimed to have been organized in Pawhuska in May 1909 by John F. Mitchell, a missionary priest from England sent to St. Thomas Episcopal Church by the Church of England. On Independence day weekend 2009, the Pawhuska Boy Scout troop celebrated its centennial with a mini-jamboree attended by over 300 Scouts from across the United States.

During the Osage oil boom of the 1910s and 1920s, Pawhuska was the site of big-money public auctions of oil and gas leases under the so-called “Million Dollar Elm” next to the Osage Council House. The population grew to 6,414 by 1920. The Atchison, Topeka and Santa Fe Railroad extended its line from Owen, a community in Washington County, to Pawhuska in 1923. As the oil boom declined and the Great Depression set in, the population declined. The steady decline has continued to the present.

Minor league baseball came to Pawhuska briefly in the 1920s in the form of two teams: the Pawhuska Huskers, which operated from 1920–21, and the Pawhuska Osages, which operated for part of the 1922 season before folding.

Geography

The Tallgrass Prairie Preserve is north of the town.

Demographics

Pawhuska is in the Tulsa metropolitan area, which includes part of Osage County.

The population of the city was 3,589 at the 2010 census, a decline of 1.2 percent from 3,629 at the 2000 census.

As of the census of 2000, there were 3,629 people, 1,513 households, and 954 families residing in the city. The population density was 966.4 people per square mile (372.7/km). There were 1,802 housing units at an average density of 479.9 per square mile (185.0/km). The racial makeup of the city was 64.98% White, 2.78% African American, 25.46% Native American, 0.25% Asian, 0.52% from other races, and 6.01% from two or more races. Hispanic or Latino of any race were 1.85% of the population.

There were 1,513 households, out of which 29.5% had children under the age of 18 living with them, 44.7% were married couples living together, 14.4% had a female householder with no husband present, and 36.9% were non-families. 33.8% of all households were made up of individuals, and 18.1% had someone living alone who was 65 years of age or older. The average household size was 2.37 and the average family size was 3.02.

In the city, the population was spread out, with 27.8% under the age of 18, 7.3% from 18 to 24, 23.0% from 25 to 44, 22.2% from 45 to 64, and 19.8% who were 65 years of age or older. The median age was 39 years. For every 100 females, there were 88.1 males. For every 100 females age 18 and over, there were 78.2 males.

The median income for a household in the city was $25,156, and the median income for a family was $31,599. Males had a median income of $25,682 versus $17,690 for females. The per capita income for the city was $13,916. About 13.7% of families and 17.5% of the population were below the poverty line, including 22.3% of those under age 18 and 14.9% of those age 65 or over.

Economy
Other than cattle ranches nearby, local employment consisted primarily of a brick plant, a creamery, an ice factory, and a rock crusher. The Osage Nation has opened a gaming casino here, hoping to generate revenue for the tribe.

In 2016, "Pioneer Woman" Ree Drummond opened The Mercantile on Main Street. The establishment includes a store and restaurant which in 2018 was serving up to 6,000 people per day. Drummond operates a boutique hotel, The PW Boarding House, and also offers tours of the blogger-turned-Food Network star's cooking lodge on nearby Drummond Ranch, from which her nickname-eponymous TV show originates.  These business ventures have solidified Drummond's place as a major economic force in Pawhuska.

Government

Pawhuska has a home rule charter form of government.

Education
The area is served by Pawhuska High School. In the past there was a federally-run Osage boarding school.

Media
Radio stations licensed to Pawhuska include:
KPGM Radio 1500 AM, featuring local news until 8:00am and the Sports Animal Format out of Oklahoma City
KOSG 103.9 FM, featuring Southern Gospel music.

The local newspaper is the Pawhuska Journal-Capital.  Its roots go back to two papers which subsequently merged: The Capital, established in 1904, and The Journal, established in 1904.  The Journal-Capital has been in continuous publication under that name since April 6, 1925.

Infrastructure

Transportation
Pawhuska is served by one U.S. Highway and two state highways.

US-60 is an east–west highway that enters Pawhuska on the east side of town at the junction of SH-99/SH-11 and follows Main Street. The highway will exit Pawhuska to the west near Elk Lodge Drive.
SH-11 is a predominately east–west state highway that enters Pawhuska on the east side of town at the junction of US-60/OK-99 and runs along Main Street. Like US-60, the highway will exit Pawhuska to the west near Elk Lodge Drive.
SH-99 is a north–south state highway. SH-99 will skirt Pawhuska on the east side of town and run concurrently with US-60 to Main Street, where it will continue south. SH-99 will then overlap OK-11 until the highway exits Pawhuska near Osage County Road 2625.

Pawhuska Municipal Airport, FAA Identifier H76, is a single runway airport located on US-60 and Osage County Road 4291, about four miles west of the city. The airport opened in September 1945.

Notable people

 Louis F. Burns, historian and author of 13 books about the Osage Indians
 Bill Campbell, American player of gridiron football
 G. R. Carter, jockey
 Ree Drummond, "Accidental" blogger, author, food writer, chef, photographer, television personality and local businesswoman
 Lucy Tayiah Eads, Kaw tribal chief
 Ben Johnson, actor
 M. John Kane IV, Oklahoma Supreme Court Justice
 John Joseph Mathews, historian and author
 Carter Revard, writer and poet
 William Salyers, actor
 Mitch Schauer, creator of The Angry Beavers
 Larry Sellers, actor
 Shockley Shoemake, Oklahoma state legislator and lawyer
 Clarence L. Tinker, United States Air Force general and namesake of Tinker Air Force Base, near Oklahoma City
 Paul Miller, journalist

Pawhuska in film and popular culture
 The movie Killers of the Flower Moon (2020) was partially filmed in Pawhuska. 
 Tracy Letts' Pulitzer Prize-winning play August: Osage County (2007) is set in a country house near Pawhuska.
 The Terrence Malick film To the Wonder (2012) was partially filmed in Pawhuska.
 In 1930, prairie and oilfield scenes for the film Cimarron were filmed in Pawhuska.

Sister cities 
 Montauban (France)

References

Further reading

  
  
 
 

Cities in Osage County, Oklahoma
Cities in Oklahoma
County seats in Oklahoma
Tulsa metropolitan area
Populated places established in 1872
1872 establishments in Indian Territory